is a railway station on the Tōkaidō Main Line in Aoi-ku, Shizuoka, Shizuoka City, Shizuoka Prefecture, Japan, operated by Central Japan Railway Company (JR Tōkai).

Lines
Higashi-Shizuoka Station is served by the Tōkaidō Main Line, and is located 177.7 kilometers from the starting point of the line at Tokyo Station.

Station layout
The station has a single island platform serving two tracks, connected to the station building by a footbridge with a moving walkway. The station building has automated ticket machines, TOICA automated turnstiles, and a staffed ticket office.

Platforms

Adjacent stations

History
Higashi-Shizuoka Station opened on 30 October 1998 as part of an urban renewal redevelopment of a portion of the former Higashi-Shizuoka Freight Terminal. A large-scale convention center next to the train station opened in 1999. These developments were intended to encourage further investment towards the east of Shizuoka city centre. Development of the area since the opening of the station has included a number of apartment blocks, a large shopping centre, and an onsen.

Station numbering was introduced to the section of the Tōkaidō Line operated JR Central in March 2018; Higashi-Shizuoka Station was assigned station number CA16.

Passenger statistics
In fiscal 2017, the station was used by an average of 8,361 passengers daily (boarding passengers only).

Surrounding area
Naganuma Station (Shizuoka)
Shizuoka University
Kusanagi Athletic Stadium

See also
 List of Railway Stations in Japan

References

Yoshikawa, Fumio. Tokaido-sen 130-nen no ayumi. Grand-Prix Publishing (2002) .

External links

Official home page

Railway stations in Japan opened in 1998
Tōkaidō Main Line
Stations of Central Japan Railway Company
Railway stations in Shizuoka (city)